The 1800 United States presidential election in Rhode Island took place as part of the 1800 United States presidential election. Voters chose 4 representatives, or electors to the Electoral College who voted for president and vice president.

Rhode Island voted for the Federalist candidate, John Adams, over the Democratic-Republican candidate, Thomas Jefferson. Adams won Rhode Island by a margin of 4.3%. All 4 Adams electors received more votes than the 4 Jefferson electors and the electoral vote was all for Adams in Rhode Island.

Results

See also 

 List of United States presidential elections in Rhode Island

References 

Rhode Island
1800
1800 Rhode Island elections